Callimetopus, described by Émile Blanchard in 1853, is a genus of longhorn beetle belonging to the subfamily Lamiinae, tribe Pteropliini. It is widespread in South-western Asia with many species in the Philippines and the adjacent islands and includes the following species:

 Callimetopus acerdentibus Dela Cruz & Adorada, 2012
 Callimetopus albatus (Newman, 1842)
 Callimetopus anichtchenkoi Barševskis, 2015
 Callimetopus antonkozlovi Barševskis, 2016
 Callimetopus bilineatus Vives, 2015
 Callimetopus bukejsi Barševskis, 2016
 Callimetopus bumbierisi Barševskis, 2018
 Callimetopus cabrasae Barševskis, 2018
 Callimetopus capito (Pascoe, 1865)
 Callimetopus cordifer (Heller, 1924)
 Callimetopus cretumus Dela Cruz & Adorada, 2012
 Callimetopus cynthia Thomson, 1865
 Callimetopus cynthioides Breuning, 1958
 Callimetopus danilevskyi Barševskis, 2015
 Callimetopus degeneratus (Heller, 1924)
 Callimetopus gloriosus (Schultze, 1922)
 Callimetopus griseus Breuning, 1960
 Callimetopus havai Barševskis, 2019
 Callimetopus illecebrosus (Pascoe, 1865)
 Callimetopus irroratus (Newman, 1842)
 Callimetopus juliae Barševskis, 2016
 Callimetopus kalninsi Barševskis, 2019
 Callimetopus laterivitta (Heller, 1915)
 Callimetopus lituratus Aurivillius, 1926
 Callimetopus longicollis (Schwarzer, 1931)
 Callimetopus longior Hüdepohl, 1990
 Callimetopus lumawigi Breuning, 1980
 Callimetopus marinduquensis Barševskis, 2018
 Callimetopus mindorensis Dela Cruz & Adorada, 2012
 Callimetopus miroshnikovi Barševskis, 2016
 Callimetopus multialboguttatus Breuning, 1960
 Callimetopus nigritarsis (Pascoe, 1865)
 Callimetopus niveuseta Dela Cruz & Adorada, 2012
 Callimetopus ochraceosignatus Breuning, 1959
 Callimetopus ornatus (Schultze, 1934)
 Callimetopus palawanus (Schultze, 1934)
 Callimetopus panayanus (Schultze, 1920)
 Callimetopus pantherinus Blanchard, 1855
 Callimetopus paracasta Breuning, 1965
 Callimetopus pectoralis Dela Cruz & Adorada, 2012
 Callimetopus principalis (Heller, 1924)
 Callimetopus pulchellus (Schultze, 1922)
 Callimetopus rhombifer (Heller, 1913)
 Callimetopus ruficollis (Heller, 1915)
 Callimetopus samarensis Vives, 2012
 Callimetopus santossilvai Barševskis, 2016
 Callimetopus shavrini Barševskis, 2015
 Callimetopus siargoanus (Schultze, 1919)
 Callimetopus stanleyi Dela Cruz & Adorada, 2012
 Callimetopus superbus Breuning, 1947
 Callimetopus tagalus (Heller, 1899)
 Callimetopus telnovi Barševskis, 2020
 Callimetopus tsinkevichi Barševskis, 2018
 Callimetopus variolosus (Schultze, 1920)
 Callimetopus vivesi Breuning, 1981
 Callimetopus zhantievi Barševskis, 2015

External links
 Check-list of the genus Callimetopus
 Gallery of the genus Callimetopus
 iNaturalist

References 

 
Pteropliini